Dame d'honneur or Dame d’honneur was a common title for two categories of French ladies-in-waiting, who are often confused because of the similarity. 

Dame d'honneur can be: 

 Short for Première dame d'honneur, which were commonly shortened to Dame d'honneur, or;
 The full, formal title for Dame du Palais, which until 1674 was formally called Dame d'honneur, though commonly shortened to Dame.

French ladies-in-waiting